Joshua Eric Thompson (born March 15, 1985) is a former American football defensive tackle. He was signed by the St. Louis Rams as an undrafted free agent in 2008. He played college football at Auburn. He has also played for the Montreal Alouettes of the Canadian Football League.

External links
Auburn Tigers bio
Montreal Alouettes bio
St. Louis Rams bio

1985 births
Living people
People from Statesboro, Georgia
American football defensive tackles
American players of Canadian football
Canadian football defensive linemen
Auburn Tigers football players
St. Louis Rams players
Montreal Alouettes players
Players of American football from Georgia (U.S. state)